Nong Manorom railway station is a railway station located in Thong Lang Subdistrict, Chakkarat District, Nakhon Ratchasima Province.

References 

Railway stations in Thailand
Nakhon Ratchasima province